Perayam is a panchayat in the Kollam district of Kerala.  The main sources of income of the inhabitants are Private Employment, Government Employment, Cultivation (mainly coconut and Paddy) Fishing and some overseas employment. Perayam being the nearest place to Kundara one of the major Industrial Hub of Quilon District and due to the mis-management, many of the Industries closed down which is directly reflecting the progress of the land. Now that the Government have declared to take of the Aluminium Industries, there is a hope of growth.

References

Villages in Kollam district